Come of Age (also alternatively titled The Vaccines Come of Age) is the second studio album by English indie rock band The Vaccines, which was released on 3 September 2012. It follows their debut album What Did You Expect from The Vaccines?, released the previous year. It was produced by Ethan Johns and reached number one in the UK.

Album art
The image on the front cover of the album is a photo of four androgynous teenage girls, each representing a different member of the band.

Influences
Lead singer and songwriter Justin Young cites No Other by Gene Clark, #1 Record by Big Star and "Spanish Bombs" by The Clash as his major inspirations during the writing of this album.

Track listing
All lyrics written by Justin Young, all music composed by the Vaccines

Charts

Weekly charts

Year-end charts

Personnel
Justin Young - vocals, rhythm guitar
Freddie Cowan - lead guitar, backing vocals
Arni Arnason - bass guitar, backing vocals
Pete Robertson - drums, backing vocals

Additional musicians
Ethan Johns - percussion (tracks 2, 4, 6, 8, 11), acoustic guitar (tracks 2, 4)

References

2012 albums
The Vaccines albums
Albums produced by Ethan Johns
Columbia Records albums